Suchindram is a panchayat town in Kanyakumari district in the Indian state of Tamil Nadu with Indian postal code as 629704. It is an important pilgrim centre and the site of the famous Thanumalayan Temple. There is an Anjaneya, (or Hanuman), statue which stands at 22 feet (6.7 m) and is carved of a single granite block.

Geography
Suchindram is located at Kanyakumari District. It has an average elevation of 19 metres (62 feet).

Suchindram is a temple town situated in the southernmost district of Kanyakumari in Tamil Nadu, India. It is 11 km from Kanyakumari city and 7 km  from Nagarcoil town 105 km from adjacent Tirunelveli district and approximately 81 km from Trivandrum city. The town of Suchindrum is renowned for the Thanumalayan Temple and was an important citadel of Travancore.

History
The town along with Kanyakumari was part of Travancore. It became part of Tamil Nadu in 1956.

Transportation

Suchindram is about 11 km from Kanyakumari and about 7 km from Nagarkoil lying between these two towns. Busses ply from Thirunelveli, Kanyakumari and Trivandram. The nearest railway station is Nagarkoil on the Trivandrum - Kanyakumari section of the Southern Railway.

Sthanumalayam Temple

Suchindram temple is dedicated to three different deities represented by one image in the sanctum and is called Sthanumalayam (Sthanu-Shiva; Maal-Vishnu and Ayam-Brahma) kovil. The temple is rich in sculpture and architecture and a visitor to this temple is amply rewarded with the sight of such exquisite art of hundreds of years old

The entrance tower to this temple is visible from a distance as it rises majestically for 134 feet. The face of the tower is covered with sculptures and statues from Hindu Scriptures. There is a covered area in front of the main entrance and the entrance itself is about 24 feet high with a beautifully carved door. There is only one corridor running along the outer wall of the temple with many shrines and mandapams scattered in the inner area. This temple attracts both Vaishnavites and Saivites in large numbers. About 30 shrines to various deities within the temple complex, the large Lingam in the sanctum, the idol of Vishnu in the adjacent shrine and a large idol of Hanuman at the Eastern end of the Northern corridor represent almost all the deities of the Hindu pantheon.

The temple has quite a few sculptures and art. In the 'Alankara mandapam' adjacent to the Northern corridor there are four large pillars each formed by a group of smaller pillars all carved from a single stone. Two of these large pillars have 33 smaller pillars and the other two 25 each. These are the famous musical pillars. Each of these smaller pillars produce a different musical note when tapped. Unfortunately these pillars are surrounded by iron grills to prevent vandalism.

Step out of the 'Alankara mandapam' and you come face to face with a gigantic figure of Hanuman. The figure is 18 feet high and depicts 'visuvaroopam'. There are other carvings and sculptures on every pillar and panel throughout the temple, which are a feast to the eye and the imagination.

Festivals

There are two important festivals, one in Markazhi (December/January) and the other in Chiththirai (April/May). During the Markazhi festival, on the 9th day the deities are taken out in procession around the streets on three festival cars.

Demographics
 India census, Sucheendram had a population of 11,953. Males constitute 49% of the population and females 51%. Sucheendram has an average literacy rate of 86%, higher than the national average of 59.5%: male literacy is 89%, and female literacy is 84%. In Sucheendram, 9% of the population is under 6 years of age.

Neighborhoods 
 Marungoor
 Kannanpathy
 Nalloor
 Myladi
 Kumarapuram thoppur

List of Schools 
 Maharishi Vidya Mandir, South Car Street
 S.M.S.M. Higher Secondary School
 Government Primary School
 Government Middle School
 Arasu Thodakkappalli, Karkadu
 Dwarakai Krishnan Hindu Vidyalaya
 St. Teresa Matriculation Higher Secondary School

Notable people 

T. N. Gopakumar

References

Cities and towns in Kanyakumari district